Men's skeet was one of the fifteen shooting events at the 1996 Summer Olympics. Ennio Falco shot a perfect 125 in the qualification round and a 24 in the final, winning ahead of Mirosław Rzepkowski and Andrea Benelli, who won the bronze-medal shoot-off against Ole Riber Rasmussen.

Qualification round

OR Olympic record – Q Qualified for final

Final

OR Olympic record

References

Sources

Shooting at the 1996 Summer Olympics
Men's events at the 1996 Summer Olympics